The flag of Ethiopia is the national flag of Ethiopia. It consists of a green, yellow, and red tricolour with the national emblem, a golden pentagram on a blue disc, superimposed at the center. While the colors green, yellow, and red in combination held symbolic importance since at least the early 17th century, the modern tricolour was first adopted on 11 October 1897 by Menelik II, and the present flag on 31 October 1996.

Colors

The colors of green, yellow and red were used for the flag of the Ethiopian Empire in 1914. On 11 October 1897, a year after Ethiopia decisively defeated the Kingdom of Italy at the Battle of Adwa, emperor Menelik II ordered the three pennants combined in a rectangular tricolour from top to bottom of red, yellow, and green with the first letter of his own name (the Amharic letter "") on the central stripe. The letter of Menelik's name was removed from the flag after his death in 1913. For unknown reasons, the colour order was flipped - with green on top, red on the bottom, and the yellow remaining in place. The flag's tricolour scheme has existed since the early 19th century, and the colours red, yellow, and green carried special importance prior to that. To commemorate its adoption in 1897, Ethiopia celebrates Flag Day on the first Monday of the month of Tikimt (September–October).

The royal flag often featured the emblem of a Lion of Judah, a crowned lion carrying a cross centered in the banner's yellow midsection. The flag is understood to be a link between the Ethiopian Orthodox Tewahedo Church, the peoples, and the nation that was united. The processional cross carried by the lion was the former flag or symbol of Ethiopia, and has likewise been in use since at least the early 17th century. Whilst red is currently featured at the bottom of the horizontal tricolour, it was on top until the mid-19th century. What the colors symbolise varies depending on point of view. However, generally, red represents the blood spilled in defense of Ethiopia; yellow represents peace and harmony between Ethiopia's various ethnic and religious groups; and green is said to symbolise hope, or the land and its fertility. The colors had historically been used by the Ethiopian Orthodox Church (red for faith and power, yellow for the church & peace, and green for natural wealth) prior to their adoption as the colors of the state, likely due to them being easy to produce and common in the Ethiopian landscape. Two French travelers in the 19th century, Ferret and Joseph Galinier, said "red,
green, and yellow are the main colours of manuscript illuminations."

Upon gaining independence from colonial rule, several newly-established countries in Africa adopted these three colors in homage to Ethiopia's resistance against foreign occupation. When adopted by Pan-Africanist polities and organisations for their activities, the colours are often referred to as the Pan-African colours.

Symbolism

 Pantone 347C
 Pantone Yellow C
 Pantone 032C

Emblem
Prior to 1996, the plain green, yellow and red banner was commonly used as a civil flag. Although a number of different emblems were used by the government since 1974, flags with emblems were uncommonly used in public outside of government usage. The basic colour schematic has remained constant.

The star is yellow on a blue disc which overlaps the green and red stripes. The star testifies to Ethiopia's bright future, while the yellow rays which it emits are equidistant and are said to represent the equality of all Ethiopians regardless of race, creed, or sex. In recent years, the government of Ethiopia has taken a conscious effort to increase the usage of the flag with the emblem, which had been seen far less than the plain tricolour. As the plain tricolour was used and seen far more often than either the flag of the Derg or the Lion of Judah flag, this was considered unusual.

In 2009, the Parliament of Ethiopia passed Proclamation 654/2009 (The Federal Flag Proclamation), which prohibited firstly amongst 23 other provisions "use [of] the Flag without its Emblem", as well as "to deface the Flag by writing or displaying signs,  symbols, emblems or picture ", or "to prepare or use the Flag without the proper order of its colors and size or its Emblem." While most offenses were punishable by a fine of "3000 birr or rigorous imprisonment up to one year," the first offense, mandating the usage of the emblem, received an increased penalty of "5000 birr or rigorous imprisonment up to one year and six months." This replaced the 1996 Flag Proclamation, which had made no mention of offenses or penalties.

Historical flags

See also
 Emblem of Ethiopia
 Flags and emblems of the regions of Ethiopia

References

External links

 
 Flag of Ethiopia
 Worldstatesmen – Ethiopia

Ethiopia
National symbols of Ethiopia
Ethiopia
 
Ethiopia